Brandon Baiye (born 27 December 2000) is a Belgian professional footballer who plays as a midfielder for Belgian Pro League side Eupen.

Club career
A member of the Club Brugge KV youth academy since 2011, Baiye made his professional debut with Brugge in a 5–2 Belgian First Division A win over Eupen on 29 July 2018.

On 2 September 2019, he joined French club Clermont Foot on a three-year contract and was initially assigned to their B team.

In January 2023, Baiye returned to Belgium to join Eupen on a two-and-a-half year deal.

International career
Born in Belgium, Baiye is of Cameroonian descent. Baiye is a youth international for Belgium.

Honours
Club Brugge
 Belgian Super Cup: 2018

Austria Lustenau
 Austrian Football Second League: 2021–22

References

External links
 
 

2000 births
Living people
Belgian people of Cameroonian descent
Belgian footballers
Footballers from Liège
Association football midfielders
Belgium youth international footballers
Club Brugge KV players
Clermont Foot players
SC Austria Lustenau players
K.A.S. Eupen players
Belgian Pro League players
Championnat National 3 players
Ligue 1 players
Belgian expatriate footballers
Expatriate footballers in France
Belgian expatriate sportspeople in France
Expatriate footballers in Austria
Belgian expatriate sportspeople in Austria